Mark Westhead (born 19 July 1975) is an English professional footballer. He is currently the Youth Department goalkeeping coach with Blackpool and is also playing for Warrington Town.

Career

Playing career
Westhead started his career as a 17-year-old goalkeeper at Bolton Wanderers after initially being spotted whilst playing for non-League side Blackpool Mechanics. During his four years there Bolton were promoted from the Second Division to the Premier League but the nearest Westhead got to any playing time was as an unused substitute in a game against Wolverhampton Wanderers in 1994.

On his release from Bolton a brief spell in Ireland playing for Sligo Rovers in the League of Ireland. He returned to England to Telford United and then Kidderminster Harriers. Later that season good performances saw a return to League football with Wycombe Wanderers where the highlight of his three-year spell was reaching the FA Cup semi-final against Liverpool.

Westhead returned to his native North West with a year spell at Leigh RMI. He them moved to Stevenage Borough with whom he spent three years ending with a Play-off final defeat to Carlisle United. A spell at Hyde United was followed by a brief spell at Droylsden until a knee injury brought a premature end to his career. Mark Westhead is now a teacher at Blackpool and Fylde college where he teaches sport the bulb 

He came out of retirement on 2 September 2011 to sign a playing contract with Warrington Town after they lost their goalkeeper David Stephenson.

Coaching career
Westhead is now a fully qualified coach and is currently the Youth Department goalkeeping coach at of his hometown club, Blackpool.

References

External links

1975 births
Living people
Sportspeople from Blackpool
Association football goalkeepers
English footballers
A.F.C. Blackpool players
Bolton Wanderers F.C. players
Telford United F.C. players
Sligo Rovers F.C. players
Kidderminster Harriers F.C. players
Wycombe Wanderers F.C. players
Leigh Genesis F.C. players
Stevenage F.C. players
Hyde United F.C. players
Droylsden F.C. players
Warrington Town F.C. players
League of Ireland players
English Football League players